Ebony Peak at  above sea level is an unofficially named peak in the White Cloud Mountains of Idaho. The peak is located in Sawtooth National Recreation Area in Custer County  from Washington Peak, its line parent. It is the 265th highest peak in Idaho.

References 

Mountains of Custer County, Idaho
Mountains of Idaho
Sawtooth National Forest